Jacques René Émile Dimont (February 2, 1945 – December 31, 1994) was a French fencer and Olympic champion in foil competition.

He received a gold medal in the team foil at the 1968 Summer Olympics in Mexico City, together with Gilles Berolatti, Christian Noël, Jean-Claude Magnan and Daniel Revenu. Dimont committed suicide in 1994.

References

External links

1945 births
1994 suicides
French male foil fencers
Olympic fencers of France
Fencers at the 1968 Summer Olympics
Olympic gold medalists for France
Olympic medalists in fencing
Medalists at the 1968 Summer Olympics
Suicides in France
20th-century French people